Chryseofusus dapsilis is a species of sea snail, a marine gastropod mollusk in the family Fasciolariidae (the spindle snails, the tulip snails and their allies).

Description

Distribution
This marine species occurs off Vietnam.

References

 Hadorn R. & Fraussen K. (2003) The deep-water Indo-Pacific radiation of Fusinus (Chryseofusus subgen. nov.) (Gastropoda: Fasciolariidae). Iberus 21(1): 207–240

External links
 

Fasciolariidae
Gastropods described in 2003